Alvin Lee In Tennessee is a studio album by Alvin Lee released in 2004.

Track listing
All tracks composed by Alvin Lee
 "Let's Boogie" – 3:33
 "Rock and Roll Girls" – 3:38
 "Take My Time" – 4:45
 "I'm Gonna Make It" – 6:10
 "Something's Gonna Get You" – 4:47
 "Why Did You Do It" – 4:47
 "Getting Nowhere Fast" – 4:40
 "How Do You Do It" – 5:00
 "Let's Get It On" – 5:25
 "Tell Me Why" – 5:52
 "I'm Going Home" – 6:13

Personnel 
Alvin Lee - guitar, vocals
Scotty Moore - guitar
D.J. Fontana - drums
Pete Pritchard - double bass
Willie Rainsford - piano
Tim Hinkley - Hammond organ
Technical
John Fowlie - design, layout
Ed Spyra - cover illustration

Info 
Repertoire Records (UK) Limited
CD No: REPUK 1029
EAN: 4009910102923

References

Alvin Lee albums
2004 albums
Repertoire Records albums

bg:Alvin Lee In Tennessee